Qualification for the 2013 Little League World Series took place in eight United States regions and eight international regions from June through August 2013.

United States

Great Lakes
The tournament took place in Indianapolis, Indiana from August 3–10.

Mid-Atlantic
The tournament took place in Bristol, Connecticut from August 2–11.

Midwest
The tournament took place in Indianapolis, Indiana from August 2–9.

Note: North Dakota and South Dakota are organized into a single Little League district.

New England
The tournament took place in Bristol, Connecticut from August 2–10.

Northwest
The tournament took place in San Bernardino, California from August 2–10.

Southeast
The tournament took place in Warner Robins, Georgia from August 2–9.

Southwest
The tournament took place in Waco, Texas from August 2–7.

West
The tournament took place in San Bernardino, California from August 2–10.

International

Asia-Pacific and Middle East
The tournament took place in the Philippines from July 1–7.

1 Republic of China, commonly known as Taiwan, due to complicated relations with People's Republic of China, is recognized by the name Chinese Taipei by majority of international organizations including Little League Baseball (LLB). For more information, please see Cross-Strait relations.

Australia
The tournament took place in Gold Coast, Queensland on June 1–5. The top two teams in each pool advance to the elimination round, where they are seeded one through eight based on overall record. The "runs against ratio" (RAR) is used as the tiebreaker. It is calculated by the number of runs scored against a team, divided by the number of defensive innings the team played.

Canada
The tournament took place in Glace Bay, Nova Scotia on August 2–11.

(*): host league

Caribbean
The tournament took place in Bonaire, Netherlands (formerly part of the Netherlands Antilles) from July 13–20.

Europe and Africa
The tournament took place in Kutno, Poland from July 13–21.

Note: No Ugandan team was able to participate in the tournament, due to the fact that some players from the previous year's Lugazi squad moved and played with the Allen VR school, the team who won this year's Ugandan tournament. Little League rules allow this in the United States, but it is not allowed in Uganda.

Japan
The first two rounds of the tournament were held on June 30, and the remaining two rounds were played on July 7. All games were played in Tokyo.

Latin America
The tournament took place in Guayaquil, Ecuador from July 20–27.

Mexico
The tournament took place in Reynosa, Tamaulipas from July 8–14.

References

2013 Little League World Series